Ashley Madekwe (born 6 December 1981) is an English actress. She is known for her roles as Bambi in the ITV2 series Secret Diary of a Call Girl (2008–2010), Ashley Davenport in the ABC drama Revenge (2011–2013), and Tituba in the WGN series Salem (2014–2017). For her performance in County Lines (2019), Madekwe was nominated for the BAFTA for Best Supporting Actress.

Early life
Madekwe was born at Mile End Hospital in East London to a Nigerian-Swiss father and an English mother, and grew up on a South London council estate in West Norwood. When she was 14, her family moved to the Norbury suburbs, and Madekwe attended the BRIT School. She went on to train at the Royal Academy of Dramatic Art (RADA) in London, graduating with a Bachelor of Arts in Acting. During her time at RADA, she appeared in a number of stage productions such as King Henry V as Princess Katherine and Wuthering Heights as Catherine Earnshaw.

Career
Madekwe started her acting career with a film titled Storm Damage. In 2005, shortly after graduating from Royal Academy of Dramatic Art she played 'Jade' in Shan Khan's Prayer Room at Birmingham Repertory Theatre. Since then, she has made guest appearances on Teachers, Doctors, Casualty, and Drop Dead Gorgeous. Madekwe landed her first motion picture in the 2007 Woody Allen film Cassandra's Dream, opposite Colin Farrell and Ewan McGregor. Following that success, she played Elisha in the one-off BBC Three drama pilot West 10 LDN, and appeared in six episodes of Trexx and Flipside as Ollie. In 2008, she landed the role of Bambi on the ITV2 drama series Secret Diary of a Call Girl, appearing in series two and three. Madekwe starred in the 2008 comedy film How to Lose Friends & Alienate People. Her theatre credits include Little Sweet Thing by Roy Williams and Flight Path by David Watson.

Madekwe made her official US debut in the 2009 drama series The Beautiful Life, which only aired two episodes on The CW before being cancelled. In February 2011, she was cast as Ashley Davenport in the ABC drama series Revenge. After being a regular for the first two seasons, it was reported in late May 2013 that Madekwe would depart the series following a guest appearance in the first episode of the third season. She starred as Tituba in the television series Salem from 2014 to 2016.

Personal life
In June 2012, Madekwe married her long-time boyfriend, Israeli actor Iddo Goldberg. They have worked together on Secret Diary of a Call Girl and he also had a role alongside her on the TV series Salem.

Filmography

Film

Television

References

External links
 
 
 Ashley Madekwe's blog

1981 births
Living people
20th-century English actresses
21st-century English actresses
Actresses from London
Actresses from Surrey
Alumni of RADA
English bloggers
English film actresses
English people of Nigerian descent
English people of Swiss descent
English stage actresses
English television actresses
Black British actresses
People educated at the BRIT School
People from Mile End
People from West Norwood
British women bloggers